Novolugovoye is a settlement (a selo) in Novosibirsky District of Novosibirsk Oblast, Russia. The administrative center of Novolugovskoy Selsoviet. It is bordered by Pervomaysky District of Novosibirsk.

Geography
Inya River is a natural border between the settlement and Pervomaysky District of Novosibirsk.

Pereborka River also flows through the settlement, which flows into the Inya.

Economy
 Kalina-Inya is a ceramic manufacturer.

Transport

Public transport
Marshrutka No. 301 passes through the settlement, this route connects Novolugovoye with Tsentralny, Oktyabrsky and Pervomaysky districts of Novosibirsk, as well as with nearby settlements.

The bus route No. 117 connects Novolugovoye with Pervomaysky District of Novosibirsk, Baryshevo, Izdrevaya and other settlements.

Bridges
An automobile bridge across the Inya, built in the 1960s, connects the settlement with Pervomaysky District of Novosibirsk. Its length is 173 meters, width is 10.5 meters.

References

Rural localities in Novosibirsk Oblast